Tambacounda Airport  is an airport serving Tambacounda, the capital of the Tambacounda Region in Senegal.

References

 Google Maps - Tambacounda

External links
 
 

Airports in Senegal
Tambacounda